The following outline is provided as an overview of and topical guide to Qatar:

The State of Qatar is a sovereign Arab emirate located in Southwest Asia on the Qatari Peninsula protruding from the northeasterly coast of the much larger Arabian Peninsula.  It is bordered by Saudi Arabia to the south; otherwise the Persian Gulf surrounds the state.

General reference 

 Pronunciation:
 Common English country name:  Qatar
 Official English country name:  The State of Qatar
 Common endonym(s):  
 Official endonym(s):  
 Adjectival(s): Qatari
 Demonym(s):
 Etymology: Name of Qatar
 International rankings of Qatar
 ISO country codes:  QA, QAT, 634
 ISO region codes:  See ISO 3166-2:QA
 Internet country code top-level domain:  .qa

Geography of Qatar 

Geography of Qatar
 Qatar is: a country
 Location:
 Northern Hemisphere and Eastern Hemisphere
 Eurasia
 Asia
 Southwest Asia
 Middle East
 Arabian Peninsula
 Qatar Peninsula
 Time zone:  UTC+03
 Extreme points of Qatar
 High:  Qurayn Abu al Bawl 
 Low:  Persian Gulf 0 m
 Land boundaries:   60 km
 Coastline:  Persian Gulf 563 km
 Population of Qatar: 2,174,035  - 142nd most populous country

 Area of Qatar: 11,437 km2
 Atlas of Qatar

Environment of Qatar 

 Climate of Qatar
 Renewable energy in Qatar
 Geology of Qatar
 Natural gas in Qatar
 Protected areas of Qatar
 Biosphere reserves in Qatar
 National parks of Qatar
Umm Tais National Park
 Wildlife of Qatar
 Flora of Qatar
 Fauna of Qatar
 Birds of Qatar
 Mammals of Qatar

Natural geographic features of Qatar 

 Islands of Qatar
 Lakes of Qatar
 Mountains of Qatar: None
 Volcanoes in Qatar
 Rivers of Qatar
 Waterfalls of Qatar
 Valleys of Qatar
 World Heritage Sites in Qatar: None

Regions of Qatar 

Regions of Qatar

Ecoregions of Qatar 

List of ecoregions in Qatar
 Ecoregions in Qatar

Administrative divisions of Qatar 

Administrative divisions of Qatar
 Municipalities of Qatar

Municipalities of Qatar 

Municipalities of Qatar
 Capital of Qatar: Doha
 Cities of Qatar

Demography of Qatar 

Demographics of Qatar

Government and politics of Qatar 

Politics of Qatar
 Form of government:
 Capital of Qatar: Doha
 Elections in Qatar
 Political parties in Qatar

Branches of the government of Qatar 

Government of Qatar

Executive branch of the government of Qatar 
 Head of state: Sheikh Tamim bin Hamad Al Thani
 Head of government: Prime Minister of Qatar,
 Cabinet of Qatar

Legislative branch of the government of Qatar 

 Consultative Assembly of Qatar (unicameral)

Judicial branch of the government of Qatar 

Court system of Qatar
 Supreme Court of Qatar

Foreign relations of Qatar 

Foreign relations of Qatar
 Diplomatic missions in Qatar
 Diplomatic missions of Qatar
 Qatar Fund for Development
 Qatari foreign aid

International organization membership 
The State of Qatar is a member of:

Arab Bank for Economic Development in Africa (ABEDA)
Arab Fund for Economic and Social Development (AFESD)
Arab Monetary Fund (AMF)
Cooperation Council for the Arab States of the Gulf (GCC)
Food and Agriculture Organization (FAO)
Group of 77 (G77)
International Atomic Energy Agency (IAEA)
International Bank for Reconstruction and Development (IBRD)
International Chamber of Commerce (ICC)
International Civil Aviation Organization (ICAO)
International Criminal Police Organization (Interpol)
International Development Association (IDA)
International Federation of Red Cross and Red Crescent Societies (IFRCS)
International Finance Corporation (IFC)
International Fund for Agricultural Development (IFAD)
International Hydrographic Organization (IHO)
International Labour Organization (ILO)
International Maritime Organization (IMO)
International Mobile Satellite Organization (IMSO)
International Monetary Fund (IMF)
International Olympic Committee (IOC)
International Organization for Standardization (ISO)
International Red Cross and Red Crescent Movement (ICRM)
International Telecommunication Union (ITU)
International Telecommunications Satellite Organization (ITSO)

Inter-Parliamentary Union (IPU)
Islamic Development Bank (IDB)
League of Arab States (LAS)
Multilateral Investment Guarantee Agency (MIGA)
Nonaligned Movement (NAM)
Organisation of Islamic Cooperation (OIC)
Organisation for the Prohibition of Chemical Weapons (OPCW)
Organization of American States (OAS) (observer)
Organization of Arab Petroleum Exporting Countries (OAPEC)
Organization of Petroleum Exporting Countries (OPEC)
Permanent Court of Arbitration (PCA)
United Nations (UN)
United Nations Conference on Trade and Development (UNCTAD)
United Nations Educational, Scientific, and Cultural Organization (UNESCO)
United Nations Industrial Development Organization (UNIDO)
United Nations Interim Force in Lebanon (UNIFIL)
Universal Postal Union (UPU)
World Customs Organization (WCO)
World Federation of Trade Unions (WFTU)
World Health Organization (WHO)
World Intellectual Property Organization (WIPO)
World Meteorological Organization (WMO)
World Tourism Organization (UNWTO)
World Trade Organization (WTO)

Law and order in Qatar 

Law of Qatar
 Constitution of Qatar
 Crime in Qatar
 Abortion in Qatar
 Cannabis in Qatar
 Human trafficking in Qatar
 Human rights in Qatar
 LGBT rights in Qatar
 Freedom of religion in Qatar
 Law enforcement in Qatar
 Qatar State Security

Military of Qatar 

Military of Qatar
 Command
 Commander-in-chief:
 Ministry of Defence of Qatar
 Forces
 Army of Qatar
 Navy of Qatar
 Air Force of Qatar
 Special forces of Qatar
 Military history of Qatar
 Military ranks of Qatar

Local government in Qatar 

Local government in Qatar

History of Qatar 

History of Qatar

 Archaeology of Qatar
 Timeline of Doha
 Timeline of the history of Qatar

History of Qatar, by subject 

 History of the Jews in Qatar
 Military history of Qatar

Culture of Qatar 

Culture of Qatar
 Architecture of Qatar
 Cuisine of Qatar
 Festivals in Qatar
 Languages of Qatar
 Gulf Arabic
 Media of Qatar
 National symbols of Qatar
 Emblem of Qatar
 Flag of Qatar
 National anthem of Qatar
 People of Qatar
 Prostitution in Qatar
 Public holidays in Qatar
 Records of Qatar
 Religion in Qatar
 Buddhism in Qatar
 Christianity in Qatar
 Hinduism in Qatar
 Islam in Qatar
 World Heritage Sites in Qatar: Zubarah

Art in Qatar 
 Art in Qatar
 Collecting practices of the Al-Thani Family
 Public art in Qatar
 Cinema of Qatar
 Literature of Qatar
 Music of Qatar
 Qatari folklore
 Television in Qatar
 Theatre in Qatar
 Qatar National Theater

Sport in Qatar 

Sport in Qatar
 Football in Qatar
 List of football stadiums in Qatar
 Qatar at the Olympics

Economy and infrastructure of Qatar 

Economy of Qatar
 Economic rank, by nominal GDP (2007): 60th (sixtieth)
 Agriculture in Qatar
 Communications in Qatar
 Internet in Qatar
 Companies of Qatar
Currency of Qatar: Riyal
ISO 4217: QAR
 Energy in Qatar
 Energy policy of Qatar
 Natural gas in Qatar
 Financial services in Qatar
 Banks in Qatar
 Qatar Exchange
 Healthcare in Qatar
 Mining in Qatar
 Tourism in Qatar
 Transport in Qatar
 Airports in Qatar
 Rail transport in Qatar
 Roads in Qatar
Orbital Highway
 Water supply and sanitation in Qatar

Education in Qatar 

Education in Qatar
 List of schools in Qatar
 List of universities and colleges in Qatar
 The Supreme Education Council
 Ministry of Education

See also 
 Qatar
 List of international rankings
 List of Qatar-related topics
 Member state of the United Nations
 Outline of Asia
 Outline of geography

References

External links 

 
 Ministry of Foreign Affairs
 Qatar Statistics Authority

Qatar
 1